Cobra Speed Venom is the tenth studio album by Swedish melodic death metal band The Crown. The album was released on 16 March 2018 via Metal Blade Records and featured an appearance of Robin Sorqvist and Henrik Axelsson.

Release
The Crown announced their upcoming release of their album Cobra Speed Venom in January 2018. On 14 February 2018, the band released debut music video for their title song "Cobra Speed Venom". The recording was officially released on 16 March 2018 in the United States and the European Union on a Digipak-CD containing 11 singles and two bonus tracks, with a third bonus track exclusive to the Japan CD. Exclusively for the European Union, the band have released the vinyl in three colors: the violet blue marbled, pale lilac marbled, and purple red splattered. The US exclusive vinyl was in white and purple splattered or dusk blue splattered variations.

Track listing

Personnel
Johan Lindstrand – vocals
Magnus Olsfelt – bass
Henrik Axelsson – drums
Marko Tervonen – guitar
Robin Sorqvist – lead guitar, backing vocals

Charts

References

2018 albums
Metal Blade Records albums
The Crown (band) albums
Albums produced by Fredrik Nordström